This article is about the particular significance of the year 1863 to Wales and its people.

Incumbents

Lord Lieutenant of Anglesey – Henry Paget, 2nd Marquess of Anglesey 
Lord Lieutenant of Brecknockshire – John Lloyd Vaughan Watkins
Lord Lieutenant of Caernarvonshire – Sir Richard Williams-Bulkeley, 10th Baronet 
Lord Lieutenant of Cardiganshire – Edward Pryse
Lord Lieutenant of Carmarthenshire – John Campbell, 2nd Earl Cawdor 
Lord Lieutenant of Denbighshire – Robert Myddelton Biddulph   
Lord Lieutenant of Flintshire – Sir Stephen Glynne, 9th Baronet
Lord Lieutenant of Glamorgan – Christopher Rice Mansel Talbot
Lord Lieutenant of Merionethshire – Edward Lloyd-Mostyn, 2nd Baron Mostyn 
Lord Lieutenant of Monmouthshire – Benjamin Hall, 1st Baron Llanover
Lord Lieutenant of Montgomeryshire – Thomas Hanbury-Tracy, 2nd Baron Sudeley (until 19 February); Sudeley Hanbury-Tracy, 3rd Baron Sudeley (from 21 April) 
Lord Lieutenant of Pembrokeshire – William Edwardes, 3rd Baron Kensington 
Lord Lieutenant of Radnorshire – John Walsh, 1st Baron Ormathwaite
Bishop of Bangor – James Colquhoun Campbell 
Bishop of Llandaff – Alfred Ollivant 
Bishop of St Asaph – Thomas Vowler Short 
Bishop of St Davids – Connop Thirlwall

Events
10 March – Marriage of Edward Albert, Prince of Wales, to Alexandra of Denmark. Alexandra becomes the first Princess of Wales since 1820.
28 July – The Anglesey Central Railway Act 1863 (26 & 27 Vict. c.cxxviii) brings about the foundation of the Anglesey Central Railway. 
23 October – Festiniog Railway introduces steam locomotives into general service, the first time this has been done anywhere in the world on a public railway of such a narrow gauge (2 ft (60 cm)).
English church services are introduced for English-speaking minorities in Welsh-speaking areas.
Sir Hugh Owen becomes an honorary secretary of the London committee formed to set up the University of Wales.
Mesac Thomas becomes the first Bishop of Goulburn, New South Wales, Australia.
Publication of The Bards of Wales, first written in 1857 by Hungarian poet János Arany, using the story of Edward I's conquest of Wales to disguise criticism of the Austro-Hungarian empire.
Machynlleth born John Evans arrives in British Columbia, Canada, with a group of other Welsh miners.  He subsequently becomes a major political figure in the province.
Spa pump room built at Trefriw.
Guest Memorial Library at Dowlais opened.

Arts and literature

Awards
National Eisteddfod of Wales is held at Swansea.
The Newdigate Prize is awarded to Thomas Llewellyn Thomas.

New books
John Ceiriog Hughes – Cant o Ganeuon
John Jones (Ioan Emlyn) – Golud yr Oes
David William Nash – The Pharaoh of the Exodus
Ebenezer Thomas – Cyff Beuno

Music
John Ceiriog Hughes – Cant O Ganeuon
John Thomas (Pencerdd Gwalia) – Llewelyn (cantata)

Sport
Cricket
23 July – South Wales Cricket Club defeat MCC at Lord's.
27 July – South Wales Cricket Club defeat Gentlemen of Kent at Cranbrook.

Births
15 January – James Webb, Wales rugby international (died 1913)
17 January – David Lloyd George, politician (died 1945)
3 March – Arthur Machen, writer (died 1947)
16 March – Dan Beddoe, operatic tenor (died 1937)
25 March – Owen Philipps, 1st Baron Kylsant (died 1937)
13 April – Walter E. Rees, Secretary of the Welsh Rugby Union (died 1949)
May – William Rees-Davies (judge), politician and lawyer (died 1939)
8 May – Charles Taylor Wales rugby international (died 1915)
18 May – Lewis Davies (writer), novelist and historian (died 1951)
21 May – William Jones Williams, civil servant (died 1949)
11 June – Llewellyn Henry Gwynne, first suffragan Bishop of Khartoum (died 1957)
18 June – George Essex Evans, Australian poet of Welsh parentage (died 1909)
2 July – Billy Douglas, Wales international rugby player (died 1943)
7 August – Edward Perkins Alexander, Wales international rugby player (died 1931)
8 August – John Herbert Roberts, Baron Clwyd of Abergele, politician (died 1955)
17 August – Joseph Harry, minister, writer and teacher (died 1950)
29 August – Sir Daniel Lleufer Thomas, magistrate (died 1940)
10 September – Walter Rice Evans, Wales international rugby player (died 1909)
7 November – Rowley Thomas, Wales international rugby player (died 1949)
probable – William Retlaw Williams, Welsh writer (died 1944)

Deaths
17 February – Ebenezer Thomas (Eben Fardd), poet, 60
19 February – Thomas Hanbury-Tracy, 2nd Baron Sudeley, Lord Lieutenant of Montgomeryshire, 62
28 February – David Williams (Alaw Goch), industrialist, 53
21 March – David Griffiths, missionary, 71
24 March – Thomas Powell, industrialist, 84
13 April – George Cornewall Lewis, statesman, 56
May/June – David Bevan Jones (Dewi Elfed), Mormon leader, 55
15 July – Edward Pryce Owen, artist, 75
8 November – Joseph Hughes (Carn Ingli), poet, 60
13 December – Robert Saunderson, printer, 83
28 December – Thomas Bevan, Archdeacon of St David's, 63

References

 
Wales